The American is a 2010 American action thriller film directed by Anton Corbijn and starring George Clooney, Thekla Reuten, Violante Placido, Irina Björklund, and Paolo Bonacelli. Based on the 1990 novel A Very Private Gentleman by Martin Booth, it was loosely adapted to screenplay by Rowan Joffé. The film was released on September 1, 2010. It received generally positive reviews from critics and grossed $67 million worldwide.

Plot
Jack and his lover, Ingrid, are relaxing in Sweden. As they walk in the wilderness outside their cabin, Jack becomes alarmed by a trail of footprints in the snow and pulls Ingrid towards shelter. Sniper gunshots ring out. Ingrid sees Jack pull a gun from his pocket and shoot the sniper. With little hesitation, Jack also kills Ingrid before locating and killing another armed man. He flees to Rome and contacts a man named Pavel, who insists that Jack cannot stay in Rome. Pavel sends him to Castelvecchio, a small town in the mountains of Abruzzo. Jack becomes nervous, and disposing of the cell phone that Pavel gave him, goes to nearby Castel del Monte instead, where he now uses the name Edward.

While in Abruzzo, Jack contacts Pavel, who sets him up with a job. He meets a woman named Mathilde, who wants him to build her a custom sniper rifle. A local priest named Father Benedetto takes notice of Jack, and befriends him. Jack also begins patronizing a local prostitute named Clara, and they begin a relationship.

In the meantime, Jack suspects that he's being followed by a man, but he still meets with Mathilde in a secluded area next to a river to test the weapon. She is impressed by the craftsmanship, but asks Jack to make a few more adjustments to the rifle, and to provide her with specific types of ammunition before they complete their transaction.

Later, the man who has been following Jack attempts to assassinate him, but Jack kills him after a chase through town. The next day the priest asks Jack if he has anything to confess. Jack has been tormented by dreams of the events in Sweden and regrets killing Ingrid, but shares nothing with the priest. When Father Benedetto tells Jack that he senses he lives in a special kind of hell, "a place without love", Jack starts to let himself feel love for Clara and envisions a life with her.

Jack calls Pavel to ask how the Swedes found him, and Pavel tells Jack that he's losing his edge. In his growing fear, he even suspects Clara when he discovers a small pistol in her purse. Jack takes Clara on a picnic to the same secluded river where he tested the rifle with Mathilde, and prepares to kill Clara. But when she doesn't try to kill him, Jack begins to trust Clara and agrees to meet with her later back in town.

Finally, Jack agrees to deliver the completed weapon and ammunition to Mathilde as his last job, but at the last moment, he re-opens the briefcase holding it. During the drop-off with Mathilde, Jack becomes suspicious that she plans to kill him. But before anything can happen, a bus load of school children arrives. Mathilde gives Jack his payment—a thick envelope full of cash, and the two separate. As Mathilde drives away, Pavel contacts her and asks if she has killed Jack. She tells him she has not, but says she is following him.

Clara then meets Jack at a religious procession in town. Jack asks her to go away with him and she agrees. While they embrace, Mathilde attempts to shoot Jack from a nearby rooftop with the rifle that Jack built. But the rifle backfires in her face, confirming Jack's suspicion and his last-minute decision to sabotage the rifle. Seeing Mathilde fall from the roof, Jack gives Clara the envelope of cash and tells her to wait for him at river where they had picnicked before. He runs to Mathilde, who is dying on the pavement, and discovers that she also works for Pavel.

As Jack walks away to go meet Clara, he hears someone behind him. Jack turns, and they quickly exchange gunfire. Pavel drops dead, having come to finish Mathilde's failed assassination. As Jack drives to meet Clara at the river, he feels his abdomen and realizes he has been shot. Jack arrives at the picnic spot and as he sees Clara waiting for him, Jack collapses behind the wheel of his car.

Cast

 George Clooney as Jack/Edward
 Violante Placido as Clara
 Thekla Reuten as Mathilde
 Paolo Bonacelli as Father Benedetto
 Irina Björklund as Ingrid
 Johan Leysen as Pavel
 Filippo Timi as Fabio 
 Anna Foglietta as Anna
 Björn Granath as the Swedish Assassin

Production

Filming began in September 2009 and took place in Castel del Monte, Sulmona, Castelvecchio Calvisio, Calascio and Campo Imperatore in the Province of L'Aquila (Abruzzo); in Rome, and in Östersund, Jämtland and other locations. As the Clooney character drives from Rome to Castel del Monte, there is an impressively long drive through the 4600-meter long San Domenico Tunnel (Galleria San Domenico) that is between the exits of Pescina and Cocullo on the A25 highway that connects Rome to Torano and Pescara. The car driven by Jack in the movie is a Fiat Tempra with Pescara licence plates.

The film's "most romantic moment", according to director Anton Corbijn—when Jack takes Clara to a restaurant of her choice, their "actual date"—was filmed at a restaurant in Pacentro, near Sulmona. The comic-acting waiter in this restaurant scene was directed to stand in front of a two-bulb lamp fixture so that he appeared to have "devil's horns". Photographs on the restaurant's walls are reportedly all of the lovers of Gabriele D'Annunzio. Clara orders Montepulciano d'Abruzzo wine for the dinner, and Corbijn said the film's company enjoyed many of the fine wines of the region during the months of production there.

The film score was written and composed by German singer-songwriter (and longtime friend of Corbijn) Herbert Grönemeyer. A 1967 song called "Window of My Eyes" by the Dutch blues band Cuby + Blizzards is played over the ending credits. The aria "Un bel dì, vedremo" ("One fine day we'll see") from Puccini's opera Madama Butterfly can be heard in the background of one scene, and "Tu vuò fà l'americano" in another. In another scene, the Italian song "La bambola" by Patty Pravo plays.

Western films and other influences
Once Upon a Time in the West (1968), with Henry Fonda facing off as a villain in a gunfight, is playing on television on the back wall of a modest restaurant where Jack has been eating. In the DVD commentary, Corbijn notes this homage and says the American Western—and more specifically the Italian-American Spaghetti Westerns by Leone and others—were explicit models for The American. Corbijn also notes the Ennio Morricone scores made famous in Once Upon a Time in the West, The Good, the Bad and the Ugly (1966), and other films. Speaking of the narrow, labyrinthine streets of the Italian hill towns where much of the action of The American occurs, Corbijn says he was thinking, in filming, of the streets of Venice and the way they appeared in Nicolas Roeg's Don't Look Now (1973).

Large segments of the dialogue between Jack and Clara are taken verbatim from Graham Greene's novel The Honorary Consul (1973).

Release

Marketing
The first official poster was released on June 17, 2010. The first trailer was attached to Robin Hood and the second official trailer on June 19, 2010, and was attached to Jonah Hex, Grown Ups, Inception and The Other Guys.

Box office
The American grossed $35.6 million in the United States and Canada, and $32.3 million in other territories, for a worldwide total $67.9 million, against a production budget of $20 million.

The film debuted to $13.2 million, including a total of $16.7 million over the four-day Labor Day weekend, topping the box office. It fell 57% to $5.7 million in its second weekend, finishing third, and another 53% to $2.7 million in its third weekend.

Critical response
On Rotten Tomatoes, the film holds an approval rating 66% based on 224 reviews, with an average rating of 6.5/10. The website's critical consensus states: "As beautifully shot as it is emotionally restrained, The American is an unusually divisive spy thriller—and one that rests on an unusually subdued performance from George Clooney." On Metacritic, the film has a weighted average score of 61 out of 100, based on 36 critics, indicating "generally favorable reviews". Audiences polled by CinemaScore gave the film an average grade of "D−" on an A+ to F scale. The score was attributed to disappointment after the film was marketed as being action-packed instead of focusing on suspense and drama.

Rolling Stones Peter Travers gave the film two-and-a-half stars, writing that director Anton Corbijn "holds his film to a steady, often glacial pace", and that the result is of "startling austerity". Roger Ebert gave the film four stars, writing, "Here is a gripping film with the focus of a Japanese drama, an impenetrable character to equal Alain Delon's in Le Samouraï, by Jean-Pierre Melville." Leonard Maltin called it a "slowly paced, European-style mood piece, short on dialogue and action and long on atmosphere".

Home media
The film was released on DVD and Blu-ray on December 28, 2010.

References

External links
 
 
 

2010 films
2010 crime thriller films
2010 action thriller films
Abruzzo
American crime thriller films
American action thriller films
2010s English-language films
2010s Italian-language films
Films about contract killing in the United States
Films based on British novels
Films based on crime novels
Films directed by Anton Corbijn
Films produced by Anne Carey
Films produced by George Clooney
Films produced by Grant Heslov
Films set in Abruzzo
Films set in Italy
Films set in Sweden
Films shot in Italy
Films shot in Rome
Focus Features films
Smokehouse Pictures films
2010 multilingual films
American multilingual films
2010s American films